Mamita Festival is a festival is observed in Tripura by the Tripuri, Jamatia, and Noatia people after harvesting various crops including rice, sesame, vegetables, etc from the jhum or paddy field. In this day Tripuri people worship Mailuma and Khuluma deities by offering newly harvested crops . On this day a dance is performed by group of young male and females named" Mamita dance.

References

Tripura